The Marin Shakespeare Company was established in 1989 at Dominican College’s Forest Meadows Amphitheatre in San Rafael, California, by Lesley Schisgall Currier and Robert Currier.

The original Marin Shakespeare Festival, founded by John and Ann Brebner, produced outdoor Shakespearean theatre at the Ross Art and Garden Center for 6 seasons from 1961 to 1967. That year the Forest Meadows Amphitheater was built for the Shakespeare Festival where it remained until 1973.

In 2001 Marin Shakespeare Company celebrated the 40th anniversary of the founding of California's first outdoor Shakespeare festival.

Marin Shakespeare Company is listed as a Major Festival in the book Shakespeare Festivals Around the World by Marcus D. Gregio (Editor), 2004.

The Marin Shakespeare Company is part of the Shakespeare Theatre Association of America (STAA).

External links
Company Homepage
Awards Received

Shakespearean theatre companies
Culture in the San Francisco Bay Area
Tourist attractions in Marin County, California
Theatre companies in California